USAT Thomas H. Barry, formerly SS Oriente, was a Ward Line ocean liner that became a United States Army troopship in the Second World War. She was intended for transfer to the United States Navy and assigned the hull number AP-45, but was not transferred and remained with the Army.

History

Building and civilian service
Oriente was completed in 1930, two months after Morro Castle. The two liners carried passengers between New York and Havana, Cuba.

In 1934 a fire destroyed Morro Castle, killing 135 people. Oriente remained in Ward Line service until 1941.

Army service
Oriente was among the ships designated for Army among the 28 merchant vessels (21 for the Navy and seven to the Army) requisitioned by the Maritime Commission's Division of Emergency Shipping announced on 4 June 1941. 
The ship was purchased and delivered to the US War Department on 14 June 1941 and renamed USAT Thomas H. Barry designated as a troopship. The ship was one of the relatively few transports owned, rather than bareboat chartered, by the Army.

Thomas H. Barry was one of seven transports hurriedly assembled in New York and sailing late on 22 January 1942 (23 January GMT) in what was then the largest troop movement attempted, movement Poppy Force, also designated Task Force 6814, under General Alexander Patch to secure New Caledonia (codename Poppy) on the vital South Pacific link to Australia. The seven ships had a troop capacity of almost 22,000. Task Force 6814 was later organized in New Caledonia as the Americal Division.

On 29 September 1941 the acting chief of naval operations, Rear Admiral Royal E. Ingersoll, sent a memorandum to the chief of the Bureau of Navigation, listing a number of Army transports, including Thomas H. Barry, that were to be "eventually taken over by the Navy." Prewar plans had called for the transfer; however, the Army retained the right to obtain additional shipping if required. Delays in Navy manning and conversion and the demands of actual wartime conditions made the mass transfer unfeasible with the Navy concentrating on ships for combat loading and the "attack" transports, and the Army concentrating on convoy loading. Thomas H. Barry was later given the Navy designation AP-45 but was never taken over by the Navy and remained under Army control through the end of World War II.

The transport, destined for Le Havre, France, with over 3,000 passengers comprising Red Cross workers, civilians, and occupation troops, returned to New York with a damaged bow for dry-docking. The trawler had recently been one of those acquired by the Navy for offshore antisubmarine patrol and returned to be purchased by a New Bedford company.

Laidup and disposal
In the mass transfer of Army ships to the Navy, Thomas H. Barry was declared surplus to Navy needs; title was transferred to the Maritime Commission on 12 December 1949 with the ship laid up in the National Defense Reserve Fleet on the James River, Virginia, on 24 January 1950. She remained there until 4 November 1957, when removed by the Bethlehem Shipbuilding Corporation, which had purchased the ship for $276,780 for scrap on 21 October.

References

External links
Thomas H. Barry (AP-45)

1930 ships
Ships built in Newport News, Virginia
Ships of the Ward Line
Transport ships of the United States Army
Turbo-electric steamships